Clare Collard is an American politician who served as a member of the Utah House of Representatives from the 22nd district from January 1, 2021, to December 31, 2022.

Education and career
Collard attended the University of Strathclyde and University of California, Irvine.

Career 
Collard works as a business services manager and lives in Magna.

Collard, a member of the Magna township planning commission, was elected to Utah House District 22 in November 2020, replacing retired Rep. Susan Duckworth. Collard defeated Republican Anthony Loubet.

For 2021, she was appointed to the public utilities and technology committee, and the economic development and workforce services committee.

In November 2020, she lost her bid for reelection, losing the rematch to Anthony Loubet by just 67 votes in the newly re-drawn district.

References

External links

 

Place of birth missing (living people)
Year of birth missing (living people)
Living people
Democratic Party members of the Utah House of Representatives
Politicians from Salt Lake City
Women state legislators in Utah
21st-century American politicians
21st-century American women politicians